Santa Elena is a city in the Usulután department of El Salvador.

Sports
The local football clubs are named El Vencedor and they currently play in the Salvadoran Second and Third Division.

Culture
Santa Elena celebrates its Fiestas Patronales from August 10 to the 18th.

Municipalities of the Usulután Department